The Norwich Devils are a British American Football team based in Norwich, Norfolk.

Overview
The Devils most recently fielded a team Division 2 East of the BAFA Community Leagues (BAFACL).
The roster is mainly local players and they are currently on a recruitment campaign with the team having successfully completed its associate year. 

The team was formed in 1984 and began league play in 1986. The Devils won their first, and to date only, National Championship later that decade in 1989, beating arch rivals the Ipswich Cardinals in the final by a score of 18–9. The Devils have made the playoffs 8 times since that national title and have won the National Division 2 Title twice since 2000, in 2002 & 2007.

Norwich Devils Hall of Fame

Senior Team Season records

2010 Award winners  

Team MVP – Nathan Evans (OL/DL)
Offensive MVP – Heith Johnson (QB)
Defensive MVP – Simon Harbottle (DB)
Most Improved Player – Ben Stockwell (DL)
Lineman of the Year – Stephen Charman (OL)
Rookie of the Year – Adam Whitbourn (TE)
Coaches Player of the Year – Wayne Diggines (DB)

References

External links
 Official Site

American football teams established in 1984
BAFA National League teams
American football teams in England
1984 establishments in England